Second Lieutenant Percy Boulton  (born 8 October 1898, date of death unknown) was a British World War I flying ace credited with six aerial victories.

Boulton was commissioned as a second lieutenant (probationary) on 13 December 1917. He joined 210 Squadron on 7 July 1918. Flying a Sopwith Camel he gained six victories between 11 August and 14 October 1918. His final tally was four German aircraft destroyed, two driven down out of control.

Boulton was transferred to the unemployed list on 5 February 1919, and his Distinguished Flying Cross was gazetted on 30 May 1919.

References
Notes

Bibliography
 

1898 births
1947 deaths
People from Hanley, Staffordshire
British World War I flying aces
Royal Air Force personnel of World War I
Recipients of the Distinguished Flying Cross (United Kingdom)